The Caistor-by-Norwich astralagus is a roe deer astragalus (ankle bone) found in an urn at Caistor St. Edmund, Norfolk, England in 1937. The astragalus is inscribed with a 5th-century Elder Futhark inscription, reading   "roe deer". The inscription is the earliest found in England, and predates the evolution of the specifically Anglo-Frisian Futhorc. As the urn was found in a cemetery that indicated some Scandinavian influence, it has been suggested that the astragalus may be an import, perhaps brought from Denmark in the earliest phase of the Anglo-Saxon settlement of Britain. The inscription is an important testimony for the Eihwaz rune and the treatment of Proto-Germanic *ai. The h rune has the Nordic single-bar shape , not the Continental double-bar  which was later adopted in the Anglo-Frisian runes.

References

Further reading
Bammesberger, A. 'Das Futhark und seine Weiterentwicklung in der anglo-friesischen Überlieferung', in  Bammesberger and Waxenberger (eds.), Das fuþark und seine einzelsprachlichen Weiterentwicklungen, Walter de Gruyter (2006), 171–187.
Hines, J. 'The Runic Inscriptions of Early Anglo-Saxon England' in: A. Bammesberger (ed.),  Britain 400-600: Language and History, Heidelberg (1990),  437–456.

5th-century inscriptions
Runic inscriptions
Archaeological discoveries in the United Kingdom
Archaeology of the kingdom of East Anglia
Anglo-Saxon runes
1937 archaeological discoveries